is a Japanese badminton player.

Achievements

BWF International Challenge/Series
Women's doubles

 BWF International Challenge tournament
 BWF International Series tournament
 BWF Future Series tournament

References

External links 
 

Japanese female badminton players
Living people
1990 births
Sportspeople from Kumamoto Prefecture